Paramecium aurelia are  unicellular organisms belonging to the genus Paramecium of the phylum Ciliophora. They are covered in cilia which help in movement and feeding.Paramecium can reproduce sexually, asexually, or by the process of endomixis. Paramecium aurelia demonstrate a strong “sex reaction” whereby groups of individuals will cluster together, and emerge in conjugant pairs. This pairing can last up to 12 hours, during which the micronucleus of each organism will be exchanged. In Paramecium aurelia, a cryptic species complex was discovered by observation. Since then, some have tried to decode this complex using genetic data.

Physical characteristics
The hair-like cilia that cover the outer body of the paramecium are in constant motion, helping the organism move along at a speed of four times its own length per second. As it moves forward, it rotates on its axis, which aids in pushing food into the gullet. It can move backwards by reversing the motion of the cilia.

Food enters the food vacuoles, which cilia push into the gullet in a process known as phagocytosis, and is digested with the aid of hydrochloric acid and enzymes (Raven and Johnson 1996). When digestion is complete, the remaining food content is emptied into pellicles, known as cytoproct. Osmoregulation is carried out by a pair of contractile vacuoles on either end of the cell, which actively expel water absorbed by osmosis from the surroundings.

Taxonomy
Paramecium aurelia is a species complex composed of 15 known species (syngens), which are

Paramecium primaurelia 
Paramecium biaurelia 
Paramecium triaurelia 
Paramecium tetraurelia 
Paramecium pentaurelia 
Paramecium sexaurelia 
Paramecium septaurelia 
Paramecium octaurelia 
Paramecium novaurelia 
Paramecium decaurelia 
Paramecium undecaurelia 
Paramecium dodecaurelia 
Paramecium tredecaurelia 
Paramecium quadecaurelia 
Paramecium sonneborni

Ecology

Paramecia are found in freshwater environments, and are especially in scums. Paramecia are attracted by acidic conditions, since they eat bacteria, which often acidify their surroundings. They are an important link in the detrital food web in aquatic ecosystems, eating bacteria and dead organic matter often associated with these bacteria, and being preyed on by protists and small animals.

References

Oligohymenophorea